Sébastien Rome (born 12 October 1978) is a French politician from La France Insoumise. He became the Member of Parliament for Hérault's 4th constituency in the 2022 French legislative election.

References

See also 

 List of deputies of the 16th National Assembly of France

Living people
1978 births
Deputies of the 16th National Assembly of the French Fifth Republic
21st-century French politicians
La France Insoumise politicians
Members of Parliament for Hérault

People from Nîmes